{{Album ratings
| rev1      = Forced Exposure #12
| rev1Score = (favorable) link
|rev2=Away From The Pulsebeat, 1988|rev2Score= (favorable) link
|rev3=CMJ #125|rev3Score= (favorable) link}}Modern Dances'' is the fourteenth album by Jandek, released as Corwood #0752. It is the first of two releases from 1987, and marks the end of the original "garage" band (which would have a different incarnation starting a few albums later).

Track listing

External links
Seth Tisue's Modern Dances review

Jandek albums
Corwood Industries albums
1987 albums